Nicolas de Rivière (born September 26, 1963) is a French diplomat who has been serving as the Permanent Representative of France to the United Nations since July 8, 2019.

Early life 
Rivière was born in Paris, France, in 1963.

In 1985, Rivière obtained a law degree (Licence en droit) at the University of Paris. He attended Sciences Po Paris  in 1987. In 1992, he finished his studies in the École nationale d'administration with the "promotion Condorcet".

Career 

Rivière served as officer in the French Minister of Foreign Affairs between 1992 and 1994. He was a press counselor to his country embassy in The Hague, Netherlands until 1997, after which he moved to Washington, D.C. until 2001. He was vice president of external and governmental affairs of EADS-Astrium from 2001 to 2002.

Rivière then served in the offices of two Foreign Ministers: first, as Counselor for Economic Affairs, Asia and North America in the office of Dominique de Villepin (2002-2004), then as Counselor for International Economic issues, Asia and Americas in the office of Michel Barnier (2004-2005).

Rivière was Deputy Permanent Representative of France to the United Nations in New York (2009-2010) then Assistant Secretary for United Nations, International Organizations, Human Rights and Francophonie from 2011 to 2014. He was Director General of Political and Security Affairs at the Ministry for Europe and Foreign Affairs from 2014 to 2019.

In July 2019 Rivière was appointed by President Emmanuel Macron as the new permanent representative of France to the United Nations, starting July 8, 2019.

Other activities
 International Peace Institute (IPI), Member of the International Advisory Council
 United Nations International School (UNIS), Honorary Trustee (since 2019)

References

External links 
 Nicolas de Rivière. United Nations.

1963 births
Living people
Diplomats from Paris
Sciences Po alumni
École nationale d'administration alumni
Permanent Representatives of France to the United Nations
21st-century French diplomats